The Thirteen Buddhist Sites of Kyoto(京都十三仏霊場, Kyōto jūsan butsu reijō) are a group of 13 Buddhist sacred sites in Kyoto, Kyoto Prefecture. The majority of the temples in this grouping are part of Japanese esoteric Shingon Buddhism and the Rinzai school.

Directory

See also
 Thirteen Buddhas

External links
 Official website
 Explanatory site

Buddhist temples in Kyoto
Buddhist pilgrimage sites in Japan